Caecilia marcusi is a species of caecilian in the family Caeciliidae. It is endemic to Bolivia. Its natural habitats are subtropical or tropical moist lowland forests, plantations, rural gardens, and heavily degraded former forest. It is threatened by habitat loss.

References

marcusi
Endemic fauna of Bolivia
Amphibians described in 1984
Taxonomy articles created by Polbot